Bader Glacier is a small glacier draining the west slopes of Rudozem Heights and flowing to Bourgeois Fjord just south of Thomson Head on German Peninsula, Fallières Coast on the west side of Graham Land, Antarctica.

History
It was named by the UK Antarctic Place-Names Committee in 1958 for Swiss glaciologist Henri Bader of Rutgers University (U.S.), author of an important thesis on the development of the snowflake and its metamorphoses.

See also
 List of glaciers in the Antarctic
 Glaciology

Map
 British Antarctic Territory.  Scale 1:200000 topographic map. DOS 610 Series, Sheet W 67 66.  Directorate of Overseas Surveys, Tolworth, UK, 1978.

References
 

Glaciers of Fallières Coast